This is the complete list of seaQuest DSV episodes.  In all, there are 57 episodes, with two of them originally being two-hour television movies. If the two two-hour episodes ("To Be or Not to Be" and "Daggers") are counted as four one-hour episodes then the total number of episodes would be 59. The series was titled "seaQuest DSV" for its first two seasons and renamed "seaQuest 2032" for the third season.

seaQuest DSV first aired on September 12, 1993 with "To Be or Not to Be" and concluded on June 9, 1996 with "Weapons of War".

Series overview

Summary of series
In "the near future" (beginning in the year 2018), the series follows the adventures of the high-tech submarine seaQuest DSV 4600. Funded by the United States government and other private loans, the seaQuest was the largest submarine to ever travel the seas. Designed by navy captain Nathan Bridger, the seaQuest was originally designed as a military vessel. However, following the death of his son Robert during a global war in the early 21st century, Bridger retires from the service and retreats to an island somewhere in the Yucatán Peninsula. Devoting the majority of his time to science, Bridger rescued a dolphin, whom he named Darwin, from a fisherman's net in a lagoon. He attempted to develop a form of verbal communication between Humans and dolphins, but eventually tried to develop a series of hand signals. During his self-imposed exile on the island, Bridger's wife, Carol, also dies, leaving him totally alone. Following the "Livingston Trench Incident" in which the world was almost plunged into a nuclear war, the seaQuest was left without a captain. The ship was recalled to drydock and refitted to become less of a military force and more of an exploration and research vessel. Realizing that the ship needed a captain that had not been "sitting with his finger on the trigger", the new United Earth Oceans Organization (or UEO) recruits Bridger to assume command of the boat he designed.

Airdate discrepancies
When seaQuest DSV originally aired on NBC, the network occasionally aired the episodes out of order from when they were produced. This resulted in a number of continuity errors between episodes. For example, in the first season, Captain Bridger's uniform originally lacked any collar insignia. It was later added after a few episodes had been completed, but, because the episodes aired out of order, the insignia appears then disappears from episode to episode (if viewing by airdate order). Later in the season, Admiral Noyce is seen as the Secretary General of the UEO in "The Stinger" and "Hide and Seek", a position he obtains in "The Last Lap at Luxury" which originally aired afterwards. In the second season, Bridger's beard is gone in "Dream Weaver", but reappears in "Watergate", only to disappear again throughout the rest of the season. Additionally, the episode "Blindsided" (which finally aired in September 1995 shortly before the third season was to begin airing) shows the seaQuest still on Earth, even though it had been taken to the planet Hyperion and destroyed in the season finale "Splashdown". In the third season, the episode "Brainlock" shows Lieutenant Brody still alive, even though he died in "SpinDrift".

For the purposes of this article, the episodes are listed by episode number.

Episodes

Season 1 (1993–94)

Season 2 (1994–95)

Season 3 (SeaQuest 2032) (1995–96)

External links

seaQuest DSV at spacecast.com - Canadian science-fiction channel's show page
 seaQuest Vault

References

 
Seaquest Dsv

es:Seaquest DSV